The Post and King Saloon is a building located in Lakeview, Oregon, listed on the National Register of Historic Places.

See also
 National Register of Historic Places listings in Lake County, Oregon

References

1901 establishments in Oregon
Buildings and structures in Lakeview, Oregon
Commercial buildings completed in 1901
Commercial buildings on the National Register of Historic Places in Oregon
Italianate architecture in Oregon
National Register of Historic Places in Lake County, Oregon